Delač ( or) is a small settlement southwest of Kostel in southern Slovenia. The area is part of the traditional region of Lower Carniola and is now included in the Southeast Slovenia Statistical Region.

References

External links
Delač on Geopedia

Populated places in the Municipality of Kostel